"Solamente Tú" ("Only You") is the debut single by Latin Grammy nominated Spanish singer Pablo Alborán, from his self-titled debut album. It was released on 14 September 2010 as a digital download in Spain. The song peaked at number 1 on the Spanish Singles Chart. The song was written by Pablo Alborán and produced by Manuel Illán.

Music video
A music video to accompany the release of "Solamente Tú" was first released onto YouTube on September 21, 2010 at a total length of four minutes and eighteen seconds.

Live performances
At the 12th Annual Latin Grammy Awards in a mash-up along Paula Fernandes and Romeo, Sie7e and Taboo, and Alborán in a duet with Demi Lovato who was doing vocals in Spanish.

Track listing

Chart performance

Weekly charts

Year-end charts

Certifications

Release history

Damien Sargue and Pablo Alboran version
In September 2014, French pop singer Damien Sargue released a French version of "Solamente Tú" titled "Solamente Tù". It was included on the album Latin Lovers. It featured Pablo Alborán.

References

External links
 Official website

2010 debut singles
Pablo Alborán songs
Number-one singles in Spain
Songs written by Pablo Alborán
2010 songs
EMI Records singles
2010 singles